Jo-Anne Baird, FAcSS is the Pearson Professor of Educational Assessment at the University of Oxford and a Fellow of St Anne's College. She is also a visiting professor at Queen's University Belfast.  She was formerly head of research for the Assessment and Qualifications Alliance.

Honours
In 2016, Baird was elected a Fellow of the Academy of Social Sciences (FAcSS).

References

External links
 Professor Jo-Anne Baird at Department of Education, University of Oxford

Fellows of St Anne's College, Oxford
English educational theorists
Living people
Fellows of the Academy of Social Sciences
Year of birth missing (living people)